Presidential elections were held in the Republic of Serbia on 16 November 2003, a month before the December 2003 parliamentary election. The election was invalidated because the turnout was just 39%, considerably less than the 50% of eligible voters threshold required by electoral law. Fresh elections were held in June 2004.

Results

References

Presidential elections in Serbia
Serbia
Presidential
Elections in Serbia and Montenegro
Serbia